The 76th Academy Awards ceremony, presented by the Academy of Motion Picture Arts and Sciences (AMPAS), honored the best films of 2003 and took place on February 29, 2004, at the Kodak Theatre in Hollywood, Los Angeles beginning at 5:30 p.m. PST / 8:30 p.m. EST. During the ceremony, AMPAS presented Academy Awards (commonly referred to as Oscars) in 24 categories. The ceremony, televised in the United States by ABC, was produced by Joe Roth and was directed by Louis J. Horvitz. Actor Billy Crystal hosted for the eighth time. He first presided over the 62nd ceremony held in 1990 and had last hosted the 72nd ceremony held in 2000. Two weeks earlier in a ceremony at The Ritz-Carlton Huntington Hotel & Spa in Pasadena, California held on February 14, the Academy Awards for Technical Achievement were presented by host Jennifer Garner.

The Lord of the Rings: The Return of the King won all eleven awards it was nominated for, including Best Director for Peter Jackson and Best Picture; The Lord of the Rings: The Return of the King tied the record for most Oscars won in a single ceremony with Ben-Hur and Titanic and it set the record for the largest Oscar sweep for a single film. Other winners included Master and Commander: The Far Side of the World and Mystic River with two awards and The Barbarian Invasions, Chernobyl Heart, Cold Mountain, Finding Nemo, The Fog of War: Eleven Lessons from the Life of Robert S. McNamara, Harvie Krumpet, Lost in Translation, Monster, and Two Soldiers with one. The telecast garnered nearly 44 million viewers in North America the United States, making it the most-watched telecast in four years.

Winners and nominees

The nominees for the 76th Academy Awards were announced on Tuesday January 27, 2004, at 5:38 a.m. PST (13:38 UTC) at the Samuel Goldwyn Theater in Beverly Hills, California, by Frank Pierson, president of the Academy, and the actress Sigourney Weaver.  The Lord of the Rings: The Return of the King received the most nominations with eleven; Master and Commander: The Far Side of the World came in second with ten.

The winners were announced during the awards ceremony on Sunday February 29, 2004. With eleven awards, The Lord of the Rings: The Return of the King tied with Ben-Hur and Titanic as the most awarded films in Oscar history. Moreover, its clean sweep of its eleven nominations surpassed Gigi and The Last Emperors nine awards for the largest sweep for a single film in Oscar history. The film was also the tenth film to win Best Picture without any acting nominations. Best Director nominee Sofia Coppola became the first American woman and third woman overall to be nominated in that category. By virtue of her father, Francis Ford Coppola and her grandfather, Carmine's previous wins, her victory in the Original Screenplay category made her the second third-generation Oscar winner in history. At age thirteen, Best Actress nominee Keisha Castle-Hughes became the youngest nominee in that category until being surpassed by Quvenzhané Wallis, who was nine at the time of her nomination, in 2013. With Sean Penn and Tim Robbins's respective wins in the Best Actor and Best Supporting Actor categories, Mystic River became the fourth film to win both male acting awards.

Awards

Winners are listed first, highlighted in boldface, and indicated with a double dagger.

Academy Honorary Award
Blake Edwards  In recognition of his writing, directing and producing an extraordinary body of work for the screen.

Films with multiple nominations and awards

Presenters and performers
The following individuals presented awards or performed individual numbers.

Presenters (in order of appearance)

Performers (in order of appearance)

Ceremony information

In light of the record low viewership from the preceding year's ceremony, the Academy sought to make several changes and hire a new producer for the upcoming show. AMPAS announced that unlike previous years where the ceremony typically was held in either late March or early April, the festivities would be held in late February. AMPAS director of communications John Pavlik explained that the purpose of moving the telecast a month earlier was "to bolster the ceremony's sagging television ratings and protect the Oscar's status as the nation's pre-eminent awards event." Despite several Academy officials denying such reasons, some industry insiders speculated that the earlier Oscar date was also implemented to mitigate the intense campaigning and lobbying during Oscar season put forth by film studios. This marked the first time since the 14th ceremony that the awards were held outside the aforementioned time frame.

In August 2003, the Academy hired film producer Joe Roth to oversee production of the ceremony. The following month, Roth recruited veteran Oscar host Billy Crystal to emcee the awards gala for the eighth time. To stir interest surrounding the awards, Roth produced three trailers promoting the ceremony that each was set to different pop tunes (Madonna's "Hollywood", OutKast's "Hey Ya!", and Pink's "Get the Party Started"). The trailers contained clips of previous ceremonies with slogans such as "Expected the unexpected" and "It's Oscar night" occasionally flashing between scenes. These promotional spots were shown at movie theaters, on several cable channels, and at participating Blockbuster stores. The Academy also granted talk show host Oprah Winfrey unprecedented access to rehearsals and meetings as part of a month-long series on her eponymous talk show covering behind the scenes preparation of the telecast.

MPAA ban on screeners
In September 2003, the Motion Picture Association of America (MPAA) initially banned distribution of screeners to awards groups, citing fears of piracy. Many independent film studios and prominent film directors objected to this decision charging that this would hurt smaller films for Oscar consideration since they heavily rely on screeners to lure Academy members' attention. The following month, AMPAS and the MPAA reached an agreement in which Academy members would receive the screeners on the condition that they keep them out of reach from people unaffiliated with AMPAS. In December 2003, a federal judge in New York overturned the ban citing that it violated federal antitrust laws.

Box office performance of nominated films
At the time of the nominations announcement on January 27, the combined gross of the five Best Picture nominees was $638 million with an average of $127 million per film.  The Lord of the Rings: The Return of the King was the highest earner among the Best Picture nominees with $338.3 million in domestic box office receipts. The film was followed by Seabiscuit ($120.2 million), Master and Commander: The Far Side of the World ($85.3 million), Mystic River ($59.1 million), and finally Lost in Translation ($34.8 million).

Of the top 50 grossing movies of the year, 45 nominations went to 10 films on the list. Only Finding Nemo (1st), The Lord of the Rings: Return of the King (2nd), Pirates of the Caribbean: The Curse of the Black Pearl (3rd), Seabiscuit (16th), Something's Gotta Give (21st), The Last Samurai (23rd), Master and Commander: The Far Side of the World (31st), Brother Bear (32nd) Cold Mountain (37th), and Mystic River (46th) were nominated for Best Picture, Best Animated Feature, or any of the directing, acting, or screenwriting.

Tape delay implementation
In light of the controversy surrounding the halftime show during Super Bowl XXXVIII, network ABC implemented a five-second tape delay to ensure that profanity and obscenity were not seen or heard.  AMPAS president Frank Pierson protested this decision in a written statement, stating, "Even a very brief tape-delay introduces a form of censorship into the broadcast—not direct governmental control, but it means that a network representative is in effect guessing at what a government might tolerate, which can be even worse." In response, producer Joe Roth reiterated that censorship would only be applied to profanity and not political speeches.

Critical reviews
The show received a mixed reception from media publications. Chicago Tribune television critic Steve Johnson lamented that the show "felt almost numbingly familiar and disappointingly genteel." He also criticized broadcaster ABC's decision to implement the five-second tape delay. Tom Shales of The Washington Post quipped that the ceremony "was about as entertaining as watching Jell-O congeal." He also added that the lack of surprises among the awards contributed to the dull atmosphere of the telecast. Columnist Tim Goodman of San Francisco Chronicle bemoaned, "The 76th annual Academy Awards dragged on without much drama or comedy, sucking the life out of the event even while it was doing justice to the masterpiece that is The Lord of the Rings."

Other media outlets received the broadcast more positively. Ken Tucker of Entertainment Weekly praised Crystal's hosting performance saying that he "has located the perfect middle ground between Steve Martin's adroit silliness and Whoopi Goldberg's unapologetic hamminess." On the show itself, he said that it "managed to do what Hollywood may not have: convince us that this was a great year for the movies." Film critic Andrew Sarris of The New York Observer wrote that the show was "the funniest and least tedious in memory." He also extolled producer Joe Roth by concluding, "As far as this old critic's concerned, Mr. Roth, you did a fine job." USA Today critic Robert Bianco commented that despite the lack of suspense due to the Lord of the Rings sweep of the awards "Crystal was able to lace funny bits throughout the evening." He further lauded the show as "more glamorous and upbeat than last year's war-muted event, and decently paced."

Ratings and reception
The American telecast on ABC drew in an average of 43.56 million people over its length, which was a 26% increase from the previous year's ceremony. An estimated 73.89 million total viewers watched all or part of the awards. The show also earned higher Nielsen ratings compared to the previous ceremony with 26.68% of households watching over a 41.84 share. In addition, it garnered a higher 1849 demo rating with a 15.48 rating over a 38.79 share among viewers in that demographic. It was the highest viewership for an Academy Award telecast since the 72nd ceremony held in 2000.

In July 2004, the ceremony presentation received nine nominations at the 56th Primetime Emmys. Two months later, the ceremony won one of those nominations for Louis J. Horvitz's direction of the telecast.

In Memoriam
The annual In Memoriam tribute was presented by Academy President Frank Pierson. The montage featured an excerpt of "The Love of the Princess" from The Thief of Bagdad, composed by Miklós Rózsa (Ben-Hur, Spellbound, Quo Vadis, King of Kings, El Cid).

Gregory Peck
Wendy Hiller
David Hemmings
Hope Lange
George Axelrod – Screenwriter
Charles Bronson
Michael Jeter
David Newman – Screenwriter
Ron O'Neal
Art Carney
Elia Kazan – Director
Leni Riefenstahl – Documentary Filmmaker
Karen Morley
Buddy Ebsen
John Schlesinger – Director
Stan Brakhage – Experimental Filmmaker
Ray Stark – Producer
Andrew J. Kuehn – Movie "Trailer" Innovator
John Ritter
Hume Cronyn
Buddy Hackett
Michael Kamen – Composer
John Gregory Dunne – Screenwriter
Robert Stack
Alan Bates
Gregory Hines
Jack Elam
Jeanne Crain
Ann Miller
Donald O'Connor

A separate tribute to comedian, actor, and veteran Oscar host Bob Hope was presented by Tom Hanks. Later, actress Julia Roberts presented one to actress Katharine Hepburn.

See also

 10th Screen Actors Guild Awards
 24th Golden Raspberry Awards
 46th Grammy Awards
 56th Primetime Emmy Awards
 57th British Academy Film Awards
 58th Tony Awards
 61st Golden Globe Awards
 List of submissions to the 76th Academy Awards for Best Foreign Language Film

Notes 
a:Eugene Levy and Catherine O'Hara performed the song as their film characters Mitch Cohen and Mickey Crabbe (to which they were credited as performers on the telecast).

References

Bibliography

External links

Official websites
 Academy Awards Official website
 The Academy of Motion Picture Arts and Sciences Official website
 Oscar's Channel at YouTube (run by the Academy of Motion Picture Arts and Sciences)

News resources
 Oscars 2004 BBC News
 Academy Awards coverage CNN
 2004 Academy Awards USA Today

Analysis
 2003 Academy Awards Winners and History Filmsite
 Academy Awards, USA: 2004 Internet Movie Database

Other resources 
 

2003 film awards
2004 in American cinema
Academy Awards ceremonies
2004 in Los Angeles
February 2004 events in the United States
Academy
Television shows directed by Louis J. Horvitz